Sweden competed at the 1992 Summer Olympics in Barcelona, Spain. 187 competitors, 143 men and 44 women, took part in 121 events in 22 sports.

Medalists

|  style="text-align:left; width:78%; vertical-align:top;"|

Competitors
The following is the list of number of competitors in the Games.

Archery

The Swedish women, despite not having a spectacular showing in the individual round, nearly knocked off the heavily favored Korean squad in the team round quarterfinals.  The Swedes tied the Koreans at 240 in the 27-arrow match, forcing a shootout that the Koreans won to eliminate the Swedes from medal contention. No other team came within 12 points of the Koreans, and the Korean team's average margin against the three other nations it faced was nearly 20 points.

Women's Individual Competition:
 Jenny Sjöwall — Round of 32, 18th place (0-1)
 Liselotte Djerf — Round of 32, 28th place (0-1)
 Kristina Persson-Nordlander — Ranking round, 34th place (0-0)

Women's Team Competition:
 Sjöwall, Djerf, and Persson — Quarterfinal, 5th place (1-1)

Athletics

Men's 400m Hurdles
Niklas Wallenlind
 Heat — 48.71
 Semifinal — 48.35
 Final — 48.63 (→ 5th place)

Sven Nylander
 Heat — 49.49
 Semifinal — 49.64 (→ did not advance)

Men's 5.000 metres
Jonny Danielson
 Heat — 13:43.91 (→ did not advance)

Men's 20 km Walk
Stefan Johansson — 1:28:37 (→ 15th place)

Men's 50 km Walk
Stefan Johansson — 3:58:56 (→ 11th place)

Men's Decathlon
 Sten Ekberg — 8,136 points (→ 9th place)
Men's Triple Jump
Tord Henriksson 
 Qualification — 15.66 m (→ did not advance)

Men's Javelin Throw
Dag Wennlund 
 Qualification — 77.88 m (→ did not advance)

Patrik Bodén 
 Qualification — 77.70 m (→ did not advance)

Peter Borglund 
 Qualification — 74.72 m (→ did not advance)

Men's Hammer Throw
Tore Gustafsson 
 Qualification — 73.52 m (→ did not advance)

Men's Shot Put
Sören Tallhem 
 Qualification — 19.65 m
 Final — 19.32 m (→ 12th place)

Kent Larsson 
 Qualification — 18.56 m (→ did not advance)

Women's 400m Hurdles
Frida Johansson
 Heat — 56.13
 Semifinal — 55.85 (→ did not advance)

Monica Westén
 Heat — 56.68 (→ did not advance)

Women's 10 km Walk
Madelein Svensson
 Final — 45:17 (→ 6th place)

Badminton

Boxing

Canoeing

Cycling

Nine cyclists, six men and three women, represented Sweden in 1992.

Men's road race
 Michel Lafis
 Michael Andersson
 Glenn Magnusson

Men's team time trial
 Michael Andersson
 Björn Johansson
 Jan Karlsson
 Johan Fagrell

Women's road race
 Marie Höljer — 2:05:03 (→ 9th place)
 Elisabeth Westman — 2:05:03 (→ 27th place)
 Madeleine Lindberg — 2:05:46 (→ 38th place)

Diving

Men's 3m Springboard
Joakim Andersson
 Preliminary Round — 376.68 points
 Final — 562.74 points (→ 9th place)

Equestrianism

Fencing

Six male fencers represented Sweden in 1992.

Men's foil
 Ola Kajbjer

Men's épée
 Péter Vánky
 Thomas Lundblad
 Ulf Sandegren

Men's team épée
 Mats Ahlgren, Jerri Bergström, Thomas Lundblad, Ulf Sandegren, Péter Vánky

Football

Summary

Men's team competition
 Preliminary round (group C)
 Drew with Paraguay (0-0)
 Defeated Morocco (4-0)
 Drew with South Korea (1-1)
 Quarterfinals
 Lost to Australia (1-2) → Did not advance

 Team roster
 ( 1.) Jan Ekholm
 ( 2.) Magnus Johansson
 ( 3.) Joachim Björklund
 ( 4.) Filip Apelstav
 ( 5.) Niclas Alexandersson
 ( 6.) Håkan Mild
 ( 7.) Patrik Andersson
 ( 8.) Stefan Landberg
 ( 9.) Christer Fursth
 (10.) Johnny Rödlund
 (11.) Tomas Brolin
 (12.) Håkan Svensson
 (13.) Jesper Jansson
 (14.) Jörgen Moberg
 (15.) Björn Lilius
 (16.) Henrik Nilsson
 (17.) Anders Andersson
 (18.) Pascal Simpson
 (19.) Niklas Gudmundsson
 (20.) Jonas Axeldahl
Head coach: Nisse Andersson

Gymnastics

Handball

Summary

Men's team competition
Preliminary round (group A)
 Sweden — Czechoslovakia 20-14
 Sweden — South Korea 26-18
 Sweden — Brazil 22-15
 Sweden — Hungary 25-21
 Sweden — Iceland 25-18
Semi Finals
 Sweden — France 25-22
Final
 Sweden — Unified Team 20-22 (→  Silver Medal)

Team roster
Magnus Andersson
Robert Andersson
Anders Bäckegren
Per Carlén
Magnus Cato
Erik Hajas
Robert Hedin
Patrick Liljestrand
Ola Lindgren
Mats Olsson
Staffan Olsson
Axel Sjöblad
Tommy Souraniemi
Tomas Svensson
Pierre Thorsson
Magnus Wislander
Head coach: Bengt Johansson

Judo

Modern pentathlon

Three male pentathletes represented Sweden in 1992.

Individual
 Håkan Norebrink
 Per Nyqvist
 Per-Olov Danielsson

Team
 Håkan Norebrink
 Per Nyqvist
 Per-Olov Danielsson

Rowing

Sailing

Men's Sailboard (Lechner A-390)
Magnus Torell
 Final Ranking — 157.0 points (→ 13th place)

Women's Sailboard (Lechner A-390)
Lisa Gullberg
 Final Ranking — 182.0 points (→ 16th place)

Shooting

Swimming

Men's 50m Freestyle
 Pär Lindström
 Heat — 22.92
 B-Final — 22.88 (→ 11th place)

Men's 100m Freestyle
 Tommy Werner
 Heat — 50.00
 Final — 49.63 (→ 6th place)

 Håkan Karlsson
 Heat — 50.73 (→ did not advance, 18th place)

Men's 200m Freestyle
 Anders Holmertz
 Heat — 1:46.76
 Final — 1:46.86 (→  Silver Medal)

 Tommy Werner
 Heat — 1:50.01 (→ 15th place)
 B-Final — Withdrew (→ no ranking)

Men's 400m Freestyle
 Anders Holmertz
 Heat — 3:49.95
 Final — 3:46.77 (→  Bronze Medal)

 Christer Wallin
 Heat — 4:02.14 (→ did not advance, 36th place)

Men's 100m Backstroke
 Rudi Dollmayer
 Heat — 58.26 (→ did not advance, 37th place)

Men's 100m Butterfly
 Rudi Dollmayer
 Heat — 57.27 (→ did not advance, 47th place)

Men's 200m Individual Medley
 Jan Bidrman
 Heat — DSQ (→ no ranking)

Men's 400m Individual Medley
 Jan Bidrman
 Heat — 4:22.96
 B-Final — 4:23.52 (→ 15th place)

Men's 4 × 100 m Freestyle Relay 
 Göran Titus, Håkan Karlsson, Fredrik Letzler, and Tommy Werner
 Heat — 3:18.92
 Tommy Werner, Håkan Karlsson, Fredrik Letzler, and Anders Holmertz
 Final — 3:20.10 (→ 5th place)

Men's 4 × 200 m Freestyle 
 Christer Wallin, Lars Frölander, Tommy Werner, and Anders Holmertz, 
 Heat — 7:20.03
 Anders Holmertz, Tommy Werner, Christer Wallin, and Lars Frölander
 Final — 7:15.51 (→  Silver Medal)

Women's 50m Freestyle
 Linda Olofsson
 Heat — 26.43
 B-Final — 26.51 (→ 15th place)

 Louise Karlsson
 Heat — 26.77 (→ did not advance, 23rd place)

Women's 100m Freestyle
 Eva Nyberg
 Heat — 57.36 (→ did not advance, 19th place)

 Ellenor Svensson
 Heat — 58.03 (→ did not advance, 23rd place)

Women's 200m Freestyle
 Malin Nilsson
 Heat — 2:03.44
 B-Final — 2:02.02 (→ 12th place)

Women's 400m Freestyle
 Malin Nilsson
 Heat — 4:13.16
 Final — 4:14.10 (→ 7th place)

Women's 100m Butterfly
 Therèse Lundin
 Heat — 1:01.38
 B-Final — 1:01.43 (→ 12th place)

 Malin Strömberg
 Heat — 1:02.78 (→ did not advance, 24th place)

Women's 200m Individual Medley
 Louise Karlsson
 Heat — 2:18.75 (→ did not advance, 17th place)

Women's 4 × 100 m Freestyle Relay 
 Eva Nyberg, Louise Karlsson, Ellenor Svensson, and Linda Olofsson
 Heat — 3:48.15
 Eva Nyberg, Louise Karlsson, Ellenor Svensson, and Malin Nilsson
 Final — 3:48.47 (→ 7th place)

Table tennis

Tennis

Men's Singles Competition:
 Stefan Edberg
 First round — Lost to Andrei Chesnokov (Unified Team) 0-6, 4-6, 4-6

 Magnus Larsson
 First round — Defeated Horst Skoff (Austria) 6-2, 6-2, 6-3
 Second round — Defeated Guy Forget (France) 6-3, 6-3, 6-1 
 Third round — Lost to Emilio Sánchez (Spain) 4-6, 6-7, 7-6, 4-6

 Magnus Gustafsson
 First round — Defeated Owen Casey (Ireland) 7-6, 6-1, 6-4
 Second round — Lost to Jordi Arrese (Spain) 2-6, 6-4, 1-6, 6-3, 7-9

Men's Doubles Competition:
 Stefan Edberg and Anders Järryd
 First round — Lost to Jim Courier and Pete Sampras (USA) 6-1, 3-6, 6-4, 6-7, 4-6

Women's Singles Competition
 Catarina Lindqvist
 First Round — Lost to Angélica Gavaldón (Mexico) 4-6, 3-6

Weightlifting

Wrestling

References

Nations at the 1992 Summer Olympics
1992
Olympic Games